Mario Grgurović (born 2 February 1985) is a Croatian retired football midfielder who last played for HV Posedarje.

External links
 
Mario Grgurović Prva HNL stats at 1hnl.net 
Mario Grgurović national team appearances at the Croatian Football Federation official website

1982 births
Living people
Sportspeople from Zadar
Association football midfielders
Croatian footballers
Croatia under-21 international footballers
Croatian Football League players
HNK Hajduk Split players
GNK Dinamo Zagreb players
NK Međimurje players
NK Istra 1961 players
NK Inter Zaprešić players
FK Žalgiris players
HNK Gorica players
NK Zadar players
HNK Primorac Biograd na Moru players
A Lyga players
First Football League (Croatia) players
Croatian expatriate footballers
Expatriate footballers in Lithuania
Croatian expatriate sportspeople in Lithuania